Triple-O may refer to:

000 (emergency telephone number), the primary national emergency number in Australia
Triple-O sauce, the signature sauce of Canadian restaurant White Spot
Triple-O's restaurants, White Spot's fast-food brand
 Star Wars Republic Commando: Triple Zero, the second novel in the Star Wars Republic Commando series

See also
 OOO (disambiguation)
 Triple zero (disambiguation)